William Bernard Cheesbourg (June 12, 1927 Tucson, Arizona – November 6, 1995 Tucson, Arizona) was an American racecar driver who participated in six Indianapolis 500 races.

Biography
He was born on June 12, 1927 in Tucson, Arizona.

Cheesbourg started racing jalopies in Tucson and successfully moved into midgets racing all over Arizona after World War II. He drove in the USAC Championship Car series, racing in the 1956-1962 and 1964-1966 seasons with 31 starts, including the Indianapolis 500 races in 1957-1959, 1961, 1964, and 1965. He successfully bumped his way into the Indy 500 field after initially being bumped out three times, which is the race record. He finished in the top ten in stock cars 8 times, with his best finish in 7th position in 1959 at Daytona and in 1966 at Fuji.

Cheesbourg returned to the local dirt short track racing scene after his Indy Car career was finished. He is known for the help he offered to many other racers. He won several Arizona Late Model Stock Car championships racing at Corona Speedway in Tucson, Manzanita Speedway in Phoenix and many other tracks. He was known equally for his ability to use his front bumper and his natural talents.

Even after he stopped traditional stock car racing, he continued helping others and eventually helped construct and drive a local high school's entry in an electric car race held at Phoenix International Raceway. He even competed for a while in local figure eight racing just for the fun of it.

He died of cancer on November 6, 1995 in Tucson, Arizona.

Indianapolis 500 results

Complete Formula One World Championship results
(key)

References

1927 births
1995 deaths
Indianapolis 500 drivers
Sportspeople from Tucson, Arizona
Racing drivers from Tucson, Arizona
Racing drivers from Arizona
USAC Stock Car drivers